Ennathan Mudivu is a 1965 Indian Tamil-language thriller film written and directed by K. S. Gopalakrishnan. It is based on Panimalai, a novel written by Maharishi. The film stars A. V. M. Rajan and T. S. Balaiah. It was released on 13 August 1965 and received critical acclaim, but failed commercially.

Plot 

A just-released convict plans revenge against the man who framed him for two crimes.

Cast 
Actors
A. V. M. Rajan
T. S. Balaiah
V. K. Ramasamy
V. S. Raghavan
 Master Sridhar

Actresses
Anjali Devi
Vasanthi
G. Sakunthala

Production 
Ennathan Mudivu was produced by Balu, and directed by K. S. Gopalakrishnan, who also wrote the screenplay. The film was based on Panimalai, a 1965 novel written by Maharishi. Cinematography was handled by R. Sampath, art direction by Rangamuthu and editing by R. Devarajan.

Soundtrack 
The music of the film was composed by R. Sudarsanam, with lyrics by Kothamangalam Subbu and Mayavanathan.

Release and reception 
Ennathan Mudivu was released on 13 August 1965, and distributed by One Films Corporation. The film received critical acclaim for its treatment and the performances of its cast, but did not succeed commercially. On 21 August 1965, The Indian Express called the film "grim, gripping and, at times, brilliant." On 11 September 1965, T. M. Ramachandran of Sport and Pastime praised the film for various aspects, including Gopalakrishnan's writing and direction, and the cast performances. Kalki appreciated Gopalakrishnan for being able to make a film within three months without compromising on quality. However, S. Krishnaswamy of The Illustrated Weekly of India felt it "suffered from basic contradictions in plot, and from the absence of cinema in its vital visual form". The film earned Maharishi a best writer award.

References

External links 
 

1960s Tamil-language films
1960s thriller films
Films based on Indian novels
Films directed by K. S. Gopalakrishnan
Films scored by R. Sudarsanam
Films with screenplays by K. S. Gopalakrishnan
Indian thriller films